Halphen is a surname. Notable people with the surname include:
 
 Éric Halphen (born 1959), French judge
 Étienne Halphen (1911–1954), French mathematician
 Eugène Halphen (1820–1912), French historian, poet and book editor
 Fernand Halphen (1872–1917), French composer
 Georges Henri Halphen (1844–1889), French mathematician
 Gustave Halphen (d. 1872), French diplomat
 Louis Halphen (1880–1950), French medieval-historian
 Baroness Noémie de Rothschild (1888–1968), born Noémie Halphen, French philanthropist 

Jewish surnames
French-language surnames
Occupational surnames